Avalon University School of Medicine (AUSOM) (previously Xavier University School of Medicine in Bonaire) is a private medical school located in Willemstad, Curaçao, in the Caribbean. AUSOM confers upon its graduates the Doctor of Medicine (MD) degree. Administrative offices for the university are located in Youngstown, Ohio.

History
AUSOM was founded in 2003 in Bonaire in the Netherlands Antilles (now known as the Caribbean Netherlands) as the Xavier University School of Medicine. In 2010, the university relocated to Curaçao and changed its name to Avalon University School of Medicine to differentiate itself from another university with the same name.

Curriculum
The curriculum for the Doctor of Medicine degree spans four years. First- and second-year students study basic science courses on the Curaçao campus. Third-year students attend an eight-week course at the admissions office in Youngstown, Ohio for orientation in clinical studies, preparation for the USMLE Step 1 examination and an overview of US residency application. Students who pass the USMLE exam spend the final 18 months in clinical clerkships in the United States, including 24 weeks of elective clerkships for fourth-year students.

Accreditation
Avalon University School of Medicine (AUSOM) states that it is chartered by the Government of Curaçao to offer an MD degree. AUSOM is listed in the World Directory of Medical Schools.

In 2019, AUSOM was granted provisional accreditation by the Caribbean Accreditation Authority for Medicine and other Health Professions (CAAM-HP), and full accredidation by the Accreditation Commission of Colleges of Medicine (ACCM). 

AUSOM is listed with the Medical Council of India.

AUSOM is recognized by the Medical Council of Canada and is on the Canadian Government's List of Designated Educational Institutions

Alumni
Some notable alumni include:

 Adam Eid Ramsey, MD - CEO of NYC Daily Post

 Rajiv Mallipudi, MD - COVID-19 Unit Medical Director, Hospital Medicine, Yale University School of Medicine

See also 
 International medical graduate
 List of medical schools in the Caribbean

References

External links 

Educational institutions established in 2003
Schools of medicine in Curaçao
Medical schools in Ohio
2003 establishments in the Netherlands Antilles
Willemstad
Buildings and structures in Kralendijk